The National Gallery is the primary British national public art gallery, sited on Trafalgar Square, in central London. It is home to one of the world's greatest collections of Western European paintings.  Founded in 1824, from an initial purchase of 36 paintings by the British Government, its collections have since grown to about 2,300 paintings by roughly 750 artists dating from the mid-13th century to 1900, most of which are on display.  This page lists some of the highlights of the collection.

For the list of all named painters in the collection and their works, see Catalogue of paintings in the National Gallery, London.

Paintings highlights

 American School
George Bellows – 1 painting 
Dutch School
Gerard ter Borch – 5 paintings;
Dirk Bouts – 9 paintings;
Aelbert Cuyp – 13 paintings;
Gerrit Dou – 3 paintings;
Vincent van Gogh – 7 paintings; 
Jan van Goyen – 12 paintings;
Frans Hals – 8 painting;
Meyndert Hobbema – 9 paintings;
Pieter de Hooch – 5 paintings;
Gabriel Metsu – 6 paintings;
Aernout van der Neer – 9 paintings;
Adriaen van Ostade – 5 paintings;
Rembrandt – 27 paintings;
Salomon van Ruysdael – 6 paintings;
Jacob Isaakszoon van Ruisdael – 22 paintings;
Jan Steen – 11 paintings;
Adriaen van de Velde – 7 paintings;
Willem van de Velde the Younger – 18 paintings;
Johannes Vermeer – 2 paintings;
Jan Weenix – 2 paintings;
Philip Wouwerman – 12 paintings.
English School
John Constable –  6 paintings;
Thomas Gainsborough – 11 paintings;
William Hogarth – 9 paintings;
John Hoppner – 1 painting;
Thomas Lawrence – 5 paintings;
Joshua Reynolds – 6 paintings;
George Stubbs – 3 paintings;
J. M. W. Turner – 10 paintings
Joseph Wright of Derby – 2 paintings.
Flemish School
Jan Brueghel the Elder – 8 paintings;
Pieter Bruegel the Elder – 2 painting;
Petrus Christus – 2 paintings;
Anthony van Dyck – 25 paintings;
Jan van Eyck – 5 paintings; 
Jan Mabuse – 9 paintings;
Quentin Matsys – 10 paintings;
Hans Memling – 10 paintings;
Peter Paul Rubens – 30 paintings;
David Teniers the Younger – 24 paintings.
French School
François Boucher – 3 paintings;
Paul Cézanne – 11 paintings; 
Philippe de Champaigne – 3 paintings;
Jean-Baptiste-Siméon Chardin – 4 paintings;
Jean-Baptiste-Camille Corot – 29 paintings;
Jacques-Louis David –  2 paintings;
Edgar Degas – 15 paintings;
Eugène Delacroix – 4 paintings;
Hippolyte Delaroche – 1 painting;
Gaspard Dughet – 8 paintings;
Jean-Honoré Fragonard – 2 paintings;
Paul Gauguin –  4 paintings;
Théodore Géricault – 2 paintings;
Jean-Baptiste Greuze – 5 paintings;
Jean Auguste Dominique Ingres – 6 paintings;
Claude Lorrain – 14 paintings;
Jean-Étienne Liotard – 2 paintings;
Édouard Manet – 5 paintings;
Claude Monet – 19 paintings;
Camille Pissarro –  11 paintings;
Nicolas Poussin – 15 paintings;
Pierre-Auguste Renoir – 13 paintings;
Théodore Rousseau – 6 paintings;
Georges-Pierre Seurat – 11 paintings;
Claude-Joseph Vernet – 7 paintings;
Horace Vernet – 6 paintings;
Jean-Antoine Watteau – 2 paintings.
German School
Lucas Cranach the Elder – 11 paintings;
Albrecht Dürer – 3 paintings;
Hans Holbein the Younger – 4 paintings;
Johann Zoffany – 1 painting;
Italian School
Fra Angelico – 9 paintings;
Jacopo Bassano – 5 paintings;
Giovanni Bellini – 15 paintings;
Moretto da Brescia – 12 paintings;
Bernardo Bellotto – 2 paintings;
Gian Lorenzo Bernini – 2 paintings;
Sandro Botticelli – 16 paintings;
Bronzino – 6 paintings;
Canaletto – 20 paintings;
Caravaggio – 3 paintings;
Annibale and Ludovico Carracci – 9 paintings;
Polidoro da Caravaggio – 1 painting;
Correggio – 13 paintings;
Carlo Crivelli –  27 paintings;
Bernardo Daddi – 1 painting;
Domenichino – 14 paintings;
Duccio di Buoninsegna – 5 paintings;
Artemisia Gentileschi - 1 painting; 
Raffaellino del Garbo – 3 paintings;
Luca Giordano – 16 paintings;
Giotto di Bondone – 2 paintings;
Domenico Ghirlandaio – 5 paintings;
Francesco Guardi – 26 paintings;
Guercino – 9 paintings;
Leonardo da Vinci – 5 paintings;
Pietro Longhi – 5 paintings;
Lorenzo Lotto – 4 paintings;
Andrea Mantegna – 12 paintings;
Masaccio – 3 paintings;
Michelangelo – 4 paintings;
Giovanni Battista Moroni – 11 paintings;
Palma the Elder – 3 paintings;
Giovanni Paolo Pannini – 3 paintings;
Parmigianino – 5 paintings;
Piero della Francesca –  3 paintings;
Pietro Perugino – 8 paintings;
Francesco Pesellino – 9 paintings;
Raphael (Raffaello Sanzio) – 13 paintings;
Guido Reni – 12 paintings;
Sebastiano Ricci – 2 paintings;
Andrea del Sarto – 2 paintings; 
Bernardo Strozzi – 3 paintings;
Giovanni Battista Tiepolo – 11 paintings;
Tintoretto – 3 paintings;
Titian – 21 paintings;
Paolo Uccello – 2 paintings;
Paolo Veronese – 11 paintings;
Francesco Zuccarelli – 1 painting.
Spanish School
Francisco Goya – 5 paintings;
Bartolomé Esteban Murillo – 10 paintings;
Pablo Picasso – 2 paintings;
Diego Velázquez – 10 paintings;
Francisco de Zurbarán – 4 paintings.

Galleries

Paintings

Dutch Paintings

English Paintings

Flemish Paintings

French Paintings

German Paintings

Italian Paintings

Spanish Paintings

External links
 Official website

 
Lists of works of art
Art collections in the United Kingdom